Bernard Sobel (1887–1964) was an American playwright, a drama critic for the New York Daily Mirror, an author of a number of books on theatre and theatre history, and a publicist.

Career
Among his clients were Florenz Ziegfeld, Charles Dillingham, A. L. Erlanger, and Lee, Sam, and Jacob Shubert.

A collection of Bernard Sobel's papers from 1923-1962 is in the possession of the Wisconsin Center for Film and Theater Research of the University of Wisconsin–Madison.

He was born in Attica, Indiana and died in New York City.

Select works

Plays 
 Jennie Knows (1913)
 Mrs. Bompton's Dinner Party (1913)
 There's Always A Reason (1913)

Articles

Books

References

External links 
Bernard Sobel papers, 1823-1965 (bulk 1901-1965), held by the Billy Rose Theatre Division, New York Public Library for the Performing Arts

1887 births
1964 deaths
American literary critics
American publicists
People from Attica, Indiana
20th-century American dramatists and playwrights
20th-century American non-fiction writers